The Thévenoud Law is a law by the Government of France that requires all chauffeurs to hold professional licenses, among other restrictions.

The law was introduced in October 2014 by its namesake, Thomas Thévenoud, the former foreign trade minister of France.

See also
 Legality of TNCs by jurisdiction

References

Law of France
2014 in France
Taxis